Faryab County is in Kerman province, Iran. The capital of the county is the city of Faryab. At the 2006 census, the region's population (as Faryab District of Kahnuj County) was 31,605 in 6,751 households. The following census in 2011 counted 34,417 people in 8,553 households, by which time the district had been separated from the county to form Faryab County. At the 2016 census, the county's population was 34,000 in 9,817 households.

Administrative divisions

The population history and structural changes of Faryab County's administrative divisions over three consecutive censuses are shown in the following table. The latest census shows two districts, four rural districts, and one city.

References

 

Counties of Kerman Province